
Gmina Szelków is a rural 'gmina (administrative district) in Maków County, Masovian Voivodeship, in east-central Poland.

In 2011, its population was 3,790, up from 3,695 in 2006.

Villages
Gmina Szelków contains the villages and settlements of Bazar, Chrzanowo, Chyliny, Chyliny Leśne, Ciepielewo, Dzierżanowo, Głódki, Grzanka, Kaptury, Laski, Magnuszew Duży, Magnuszew Mały, Makowica, Nowy Strachocin, Nowy Szelków, Orzyc, Pomaski Małe, Pomaski Wielkie, Przeradowo, Rostki, Smrock-Dwór, Smrock-Kolonia, Stary Strachocin, Szelków and Zakliczewo.

Neighbouring gminas
Gmina Szelków is bordered by the town of Maków Mazowiecki and by the gminas'' of Czerwonka, Karniewo, Obryte, Pułtusk and Rzewnie.

References

External links
Polish official population figures 2006

Szelkow
Maków County